South West Township is a township in Barton County, Missouri, USA.  As of the 2000 census, its population was 669.

South West Township lies in the southwestern corner of Barton County, hence the name.

Geography
According to the USGS, it contains one cemetery, Mindenmines.

The stream of Glendale Fork runs through this township.

References

 USGS Geographic Names Information System (GNIS)

External links
 US-Counties.com
 City-Data.com

Townships in Barton County, Missouri
Townships in Missouri